Alejandro "Álex" Jiménez Sánchez (born 8 May 2005) is a Spanish professional footballer currently playing as a right-back for Real Madrid Castila.

Club career
Born in Madrid and raised in Talavera de la Reina, Jiménez started his career with local sides Talavera and UD Talavera. He joined Real Madrid in 2012, and initially started his career as a forward, before moving to right-wing, and eventually right-back. His performances for the youth teams of Real Madrid caught the attention of German side Bayern Munich and English side Chelsea.

Despite this interest, he signed his first professional contract with Los Blancos until 2027, making him the highest paid Castilla player.

International career
Jiménez has represented Spain at youth international level.

Style of play
Strong and aggressive in duels, Jiménez is also noted for his rapid pace, good anticipation and wide passing range. He lists Liverpool right-back Trent Alexander-Arnold as a player he admires.

Career statistics

Club

Notes

References

2005 births
Living people
Footballers from Madrid
Spanish footballers
Spain youth international footballers
Association football defenders
Primera Federación players
Talavera CF players
Real Madrid CF players